Khanchobany was a Turkic semi-nomadic tribe formed in the 17th century in Shirvan. Khanchobany means "Khan's shepherd". House of Sarkar was a noble clan from Khanchobany tribe. Tribe also gave his name to a folk dance Khanchobany. Khanchobany tribe were living primarily in Khanchobany mahal of Shirvan Khanate, because of being noble clan, mahal was not subject to any form taxation.

References

Turkic peoples of Asia